Guido De Philippis (born August 16, 1985 at Fiesole) is an Italian mathematician. He works on the calculus of variations, partial differential equations and geometric measure theory.

In 2016 he was awarded the EMS Prize, "for his outstanding contributions to the regularity of solutions of Monge–Ampère equation and optimal maps and for his deep work on quantitative stability inequalities for the first eigenvalue of the Laplacian and rigidity in some isoperimetric type inequalities.". In 2018 he was awarded the Stampacchia Medal. In 2021 he received the ISAAC award.

De Philippis was a PhD student of Luigi Ambrosio and Luis Caffarelli.

Selected publications
 
 
 
Regularity of optimal transport maps and applications, Ed. della Normale, Springer 2013 (Dissertation)

References

21st-century Italian mathematicians
1985 births
Living people
Mathematical analysts